A stratotype or type section in geology is the physical location or outcrop of a particular reference exposure of a stratigraphic sequence or stratigraphic boundary. If the stratigraphic unit is layered, it is called a stratotype, whereas the standard of reference for unlayered rocks is the type locality.  

Also it can be defined as "The particular sequence of strata chosen as standard of reference of a layered stratigraphic unit." 

When a stratigraphic unit is nowhere fully exposed, the original type section may be supplemented with reference sections covering the full thickness of the unit. A reference section may also be defined when the original type section is poorly exposed, or for historical units which were designated without specifying a type section according to more modern standards.

See also 
 Global Boundary Stratotype Section and Point

References 

Geochronologically significant locations
Paleogeography
Stratigraphy